Horní Benešov (until 1926 Benešov) is a town in Bruntál District in the Moravian-Silesian Region of the Czech Republic. It has about 2,200 inhabitants. Horní Benešov has a long mining tradition.

Administrative parts

The village of Luhy is an administrative part of Horní Benešov.

Geography
It is located in the Nízký Jeseník mountain range.

History

The first written mention of Horní Benešov is from 1226, when it was a mining settlement. The silver mines were one of the oldest in Czech lands. The town of Benešov was founded on the site of the settlement in 1253, and the town rights were confirmed in 1271 by King Ottokar II.

The town was destroyed by a Hungarian invasion in 1474 and then during the Thirty Years' War. The mining was in decline since 17th century. During the 19th and 20th centuries, economic development of Benešov was driven mostly by textile industry.

According to the Austrian administration census of 1910 the town had 3,826 inhabitants, 3,800 (99.9%) were German-speaking. Most populous religious groups were Roman Catholics with 3,766 (98.4%), followed by Protestants with 30 (0.8%) and the Jews with 25 (0.6%).

Before World War I, the town was part of the Austrian Silesia region. After World War I, the town was within the state of Czechoslovakia and in 1926 was given its present name. From 1938 to 1945 Horní Benešov was annexed by Nazi Germany and administered as a part of Reichsgau Sudetenland. After the war, the German population was expelled.

In 1902–1914 and in 1951–1992, baryte was mined here.

Sights
The Church of Saint Catherine was built in the Neoclassical style in 1719. It has preserved elements from the original building from the 16th century.

Twin towns – sister cities

Horní Benešov is twinned with:
 Pszów, Poland

References

External links

Cities and towns in the Czech Republic
Populated places in Bruntál District